Anton Milanov Kuzov (born 22 August 1929, date of death unknown) was a Bulgarian basketball player. He competed in the men's tournament at the 1952 Summer Olympics.

References

External links

1929 births
Year of death missing
Bulgarian men's basketball players
Olympic basketball players of Bulgaria
Basketball players at the 1952 Summer Olympics
Place of birth missing